Lumberville Historic District is a national historic district located in Lumberville, Solebury Township, Bucks County, Pennsylvania.  The district includes 85 contributing buildings in the riverfront and canal village of Lumberville. They include a variety of residential, commercial, and institutional buildings.

It was added to the National Register of Historic Places in 1984 .

References

Historic districts in Bucks County, Pennsylvania
Historic districts on the National Register of Historic Places in Pennsylvania
National Register of Historic Places in Bucks County, Pennsylvania